Bloomfield, New Brunswick can refer to one of three places.

Bloomfield, Carleton County, New Brunswick
Bloomfield, Kings County, New Brunswick
Bloomfield Ridge, York County, New Brunswick is also known to some as Bloomfield